Mamatsev is a rural locality (a khutor) in Dukmasovskoye Rural Settlement of Shovgenovsky District, the Republic of Adygea, Russia. The population was 224 as of 2018. There are 5 streets.

Geography 
Mamatsev is located 35 km southwest of Khakurinokhabl (the district's administrative centre) by road. Pikalin is the nearest rural locality.

References 

Rural localities in Shovgenovsky District